Cornelius Joshua Wilson served as Anglican Bishop of Costa Rica from 1978–2001.
Born in Siquirres, of Limón on November 2nd, 1932, the fourth of eight children born to parents Eliazar Mclean and Teresa Wilson of Afro-Caribbean origin. He starts primary school in Escuela Justo Facio of Siquirres and concludes it in the Escuela General Tomas Guardia School of Limon.  His high school studies were in the Colegio de Limón. Mr. Wilson married Eulalia Cole on April 19,1952.

Notes

External links 
Biography of bishop Cornelius J.Wilson by nathasha wilson picon on Prezi

20th-century Costa Rican Anglican bishops
1952 births
Living people
Place of birth missing (living people)
Anglican bishops of Costa Rica